The paddle steamer PS Weeroona was built by A. & J. Inglis, Pointhouse, Glasgow, Scotland and launched in 1910. It was initially owned by Huddart Parker Ltd, Melbourne. The ship was requisitioned for wartime service and used by the United States Army as a barracks and quarters ship through the war.

Excursion service

Weeroona was one of several Port Phillip Bay excursion steamers operating out of Melbourne for day trips, excursions and picnicking to destinations such as Portarlington, Queenscliff and Sorrento. The excursion vessel was equipped as a luxury excursion ship capable of carrying 1,900 passengers.

During the 1925 visit of the American fleet the ship was involved in an incident described as "A gratuitous insult to the Prime Minister" when the ship's firemen went on strike with the Commonwealth Ministers and a thousand guests, including foreign consuls and military officers, aboard in protest of comments made by the Prime Minister and demanding he depart the ship, although he was actually not aboard. The firemen demanded a bond of £100 that he was not aboard, a demand rejected, and the trip was cancelled.

By 1932 the newer Weeroona was the only one of the line remaining in service due to increased land transport with Weeroona being purchased for war service 17 March 1942.

An article of 1 November 1943 noting the steamer might not resume excursion service after the war mentions the company, Bay Steamers, was in liquidation and that the ship operated thirty-three years without a collision, that four of her captains had retired and died and that she had made 2,774 voyages, travelled  and carried 3,030,508 passengers in that service.

U.S. Army World War II service

Weeroona became part of the United States Army permanent local fleet under the Southwest Pacific Area command's supply organisation, United States Army Services of Supply, Southwest Pacific Area (USASOS SWPA), and was used extensively serving as a quarters ship for American maritime personnel. As part of the Small Ships Section the vessel was given the local fleet number S-195 and perhaps also as CSQ-1. Weeroona was used as a quarters ship by Australian personnel under contract to the U.S. Army's Small Ships Section in Sydney and New Guinea. The ship was also used by U.S. Army Signal Corps personnel, some of whom were setting up small ships as communications ships, as barracks and dubbed CSQ for communications ship quarters. Weeroona was towed from New Guinea to the Philippines to support Allied forces there at Leyte Gulf and eventually serving as a barracks and convalescent ship in Manila until towed back to Sydney, where she lingered in the harbour until broken up in 1951.

Footnotes

References

References cited

External links
Images of Yesteryear: Sea & River (Photos of Weeroona in collection)
Mornington Peninsula Paddle Steamers of Port Philip Bay
Shipspotting: WEEROONA

1910 ships
Ships built on the River Clyde
Ferries of Victoria (Australia)
Ships of the United States Army